Allomethus catharinensis is a species of fly in the family Pipunculidae. It was described by Rafael in 1991.

Distribution
Brazil.

References

Pipunculidae
Insects described in 1991
Diptera of South America